The Battle of Pharsalus was fought in late 1277 at the plain of Pharsalus in Thessaly between an invading Byzantine army led by the megas stratopedarches John Synadenos and megas konostaulos Michael Kaballarios, and the forces of John I Doukas, ruler of Thessaly. This was the first major Byzantine campaign against Thessaly after the failure of the previous expedition at the Battle of Neopatras (dated variously to 1273–1275). The battle resulted in a crushing victory for John Doukas: Synadenos was captured, while Kaballarios died shortly afterwards of his wounds.

Sources 
 

13th century in Greece
Pharsalus
Medieval Thessaly
Pharsalus 1277
1277 in Europe
1270s in the Byzantine Empire
Michael VIII Palaiologos